Pachliopta polyphontes is a species of butterfly from the family Papilionidae that is found in Sulawesi and on the Moluccas.

Subspecies
Pachliopta polyphontes polyphontes (Sulawesi, Talaud)
Pachliopta polyphontes rosea (Oberthür, 1879) (Selajar Islands)
Pachliopta polyphontes aipytos Fruhstorfer (Sula Islands) 
Pachliopta polyphontes sejanus Fruhstorfer (Bachan, Halmahera, Ternate, Morotai)

References

Pachliopta
Butterflies described in 1836
Butterflies of Indonesia